Maxime Jean Marcel Bossis (born 26 June 1955) is a French retired professional footballer who played as a defender.

Bossis spent most of his career playing for Nantes, a club he helped win three Ligue 1 titles and one Coupe de France. He obtained 76 caps (one goal) for the France national team, won the 1984 European Football Championship and played in two World Cup semi-finals.

Club career 
Bossis was born in Saint-André-Treize-Voies, Vendée. A longtime starter for FC Nantes during the club's most successful period during the 1970s and 1980s, he was noted chiefly as a full-back on the left flank, but filled in at various roles in defence. Bossis spent much of his time at right back during Nantes' championship-winning seasons in 1977 and 1980, in which Thierry Tusseau normally started on the left, but made the left back position his own beginning in 1981. Bossis helped Nantes to finish first or second in every season between 1976 and 1981. The club added a third title in 1983, finishing ten points ahead of second-place Girondins Bordeaux. In 1985, Bossis moved to the ambitious RC Paris, but the Parisian club achieved only modest success in spite of heavy spending that acquired such players as Enzo Francescoli and Pierre Littbarski. Bossis returned to Nantes for one final season in 1990, lining up next to future French international Marcel Desailly before retiring from play.

Bossis was named Footballer of the Year by France Football in 1979 and 1981.

International career 
Bossis also represented the France national team for ten years, appearing at the 1978, 1982, and 1986 World Cups, reaching the semifinals of the latter two editions of the tournament. He is mostly remembered for missing France's last penalty in the 1982 World Cup semifinal against West Germany. While the score was tied at 4–4, Bossis missed the next penalty, allowing Horst Hrubesch to score the last penalty and send the Germans to the final. Bossis was also an important member of the France team that won the European Championship on home soil in 1984. From 1985 to 1992, he held the French record of caps, before fellow defender Manuel Amoros established a new mark with 82 caps. He also held the French record of matches played in the FIFA World Cup with 15, which was subsequently surpassed by Fabien Barthez in 2006.

Personal life 
Bossis' younger brother, Joël, also played professional football and holds the all-time record for most goals scored for Chamois Niortais.

After retirement 
After he retired in 1991, Bossis briefly embraced a career as a football executive, heading the Coupe de France Central Commission (1993–1995) before he joined Saint-Étienne as sporting director (1996–1997). He then reinvented himself as a TV commentator, working first for TPS, then for Orange Sport and since 2014 for BeIn Sport.

Honours 
Nantes
Ligue 1: 1976–77, 1979–80, 1982–83
Coupe de France: 1978–79

France
UEFA European Football Championship: 1984
Artemio Franchi Trophy: 1985
FIFA World Cup: third place 1986; fourth place 1982

Individual
French Player of the Year: 1979, 1981

References

External links 
 
 
 

1955 births
Living people
Sportspeople from Vendée
French footballers
Association football defenders
France international footballers
1978 FIFA World Cup players
1982 FIFA World Cup players
UEFA Euro 1984 players
1986 FIFA World Cup players
UEFA European Championship-winning players
FC Nantes players
Racing Club de France Football players
Ligue 1 players
French football managers
AS Saint-Étienne managers
Footballers from Pays de la Loire